Panteón Rococó is a Mexican ska band from Mexico City. Despite flourishing black markets, they have sold thousands of records. While being stars in Mexico, they have been touring Europe for the last several years, especially Germany, where their European Label Übersee Records is located.

Musical style and lyrics 
Panteón Rococó blends several styles of popular music such as rock, punk, salsa, mariachi, reggae, ska, and also mestizo-music into a very energetic, groovy sound. As they are very political people and support the EZLN in Chiapas, some of their lyrics contain political statements, while many other works are love songs.

Group members

Discography

Albums 
 1997: Toloache pa' mi Negra
 1999: A la Izquierda de la Tierra
 2002: Compañeros Musicales
 2004: Tres Veces Tres
 2006: 10 Años: Un Panteon Muy Vivo
 2007: Panteón Rococó
 2010: Ejército de Paz
 2012: Ni Carne Ni Pescado
 2016: XX Años: En Vivo
 2016: Tres veces Tres
 2019: Infiernos

Contributions on compilations 
 1998: "Skuela de Baile Vol. 1" with L'América
 1998: "Skuela de Baile Vol. 2" with Cúrame (Ver. '98)
 2003: "Sin ton ni Sonia" with Sonia and La rubia y el demonio
 2003: "Tributo a José Alfredo Jiménez XXX" with Tu recuerdo y yo
 2003: "Ofrenda a Rockdrigo González" with Los intelectuales
 2011: "Carnaval Toda la Vida!" with Gallo Rojo
 2018: infiernos *invitados especiales*

External links 
 

Rock en Español music groups
Musical groups from Mexico City